Anakapalli revenue division is an administrative division in the Anakapalli district of the Indian state of Andhra Pradesh. It is one of the two revenue divisions in the district which consists of twelve mandals under its administration. Anakapalli is the divisional headquarters.

Administration 
There are 12 mandals under the administration of Anakapalle revenue division. They are:

Demographics 
At the time of the 2011 census the division had a population of 8,21,034 of which 7,09,263 was rural and 1,11,771 urban. Scheduled Castes and Scheduled Tribes made up 7.45% and 3.57% of the population respectively.

Hindus are 98.27% of the population while Christians are 0.70% and Muslims 0.69%.

At the time of the 2011 census 98.99% of the population spoke Telugu as their first language.

See also 
 List of revenue divisions in Andhra Pradesh
 List of mandals in Andhra Pradesh

References 

Revenue divisions in Anakapalli district